Aspen Plus, Aspen HYSYS, ChemCad and MATLAB, PRO are the commonly used process simulators for modeling, simulation and optimization of a distillation process in the chemical industries. Distillation is the technique of preferential separation of the more volatile components from the less volatile ones in a feed followed by condensation. The vapor produced is richer in the more volatile components. The distribution of the component in the two phase is governed by the vapour-liquid equilibrium relationship. In practice, distillation may be carried out by either two principal methods. The first method is based on the production of vapor boiling the liquid mixture to be separated and condensing the vapors without allowing any liquid to return to the still. There is no reflux. The second method is based on the return of part of the condensate to still under such conditions that this returning liquid is brought into intimate contact with the vapors on their way to condenser.

Chemical process modeling 

Chemical Process modeling is a technique used in chemical engineering process design. Process modeling is defined as the physical, mathematical or logical representation of the real process, system or phenomena using model library present in the process simulator software. In this technique by using process simulator software we define a system of interconnected components. A system is defined as group of object that are joined together in some regular order or interdependence toward the accomplishment of some purpose. Which system are then solved so that the steady-state or dynamic behavior of the system can be predicted. Components of the system and connections are represented as a process flow diagram. A flow diagram for the ammonia process (Finlayson, 2006) is shown in figure 1 below using aspen plus software.

The most important result of developing of mathematical model of chemical engineering system is the understanding that is gained what really make the process tick. Mathematical models can be useful in all phase of chemical engineering from research and development to plant operations and even in business and economics studies. The basis for the mathematical models are the fundamentals physical and chemical law, such as the laws of conservation of mass, energy and momentum, degree of freedom. Mathematical modeling is very much an art. It takes experience, practice and brain power to be a good mathematical modeler.

Process simulation 
A simulation is the representation of the real world process or system over a period of time. Simulation can be done by hand or on a computer, simulation involves the generation of artificial history of the system and the observation of artificial history to draw inferences concerning of the operating characteristic of the real system. Thus, simulation modelling can be used both as an analysis tool for predicating the effect of changes to existing system and as a design tool to predict the performance of new system under the varying set of circumstances. Process simulation describes processes flow diagram where various unit operations are present and connected by product streams.

It is extensively used both in educational arena and industry to predicate the behavior of a process using material balance equations, equilibrium relationship, reaction kinetics, etc.

Batch distillation 
In batch distillation, the feed is charged to the still pot to which heat is supplied continuously through a steam jacket or a steam coil. As the mixture boils, it generates a vapour richer in the more volatile. But as boiling continue, concentration of more volatile in the liquid decrease. It is generally assumed that equilibrium vaporization occurs in the still. The vapour is led to a condenser and the condensate or the top product is collected in the receiver. At the beginning, the condensate will be pretty rich in the more volatiles, but the concentrations of the more volatiles in it decrease as the condensate keep on accumulating in the receiver. The condensate is usually withdrawn intermittently having products or cuts of different concentrations. Batch distillation is used when the feed rate is not large enough to justify installation of a continuous distillation unit. It may also be used when the constituents greatly differ in volatility. Figure 1 show the batch distillation setup.

Batch distillation of binary mixture 
Let L be the moles of material in the still and x be the concentration of the volatile component (i.e. The following differential mass balance equation may be written as:Let L be the moles of material in the still and x be the concentration of the volatile component (i.e. The following 
differential mass balance equation may be written as:

Total material balance:                                   =                                                                                  ----- (i)

Component A balance:                                                                                                    ----- (ii)                                                                                        ----- (iii)

Equation (i) means that the total amount of vapour generated must be equal to the decrease in the total amount of liquid. Similarly, equation (ii) means that loss in the number of moles of A from the still because of vaporization is the same as the amount of A in the small amount of vapour generated.

Putting   in Equation (iii) and rearranging,

=                                                          ------(iv)

If distillation starts with F moles of feed of concentration  and continues till the amount of liquid reduces to W moles (composition =xw), the above equation can be integrated to give

   =               =                     ------(v)

Equation (v) is the basic equation of batch distillation and is called as the Rayleigh equation.Rayleigh equation is used for calculation of data in the batch distillation column.

Aspen Plus software

History 
During the 1970s, the research have develop a novel technology at the Massachusetts Institute of Technology (MIT) with United States Department of Energy funding. The undertaking known as the Advanced System for Process Engineering (ASPEN) Project, was originally intended to design nonlinear simulation software that could aid in development of synthetic fuels. In 1981, AspenTech, a publicly traded company was founded to commercialize the simulation software package. Aspen Tech went public in October 1994 and has acquired 19 industry-leading companies as a part of its mission to offer complete, integrated solution to the process industries.

As the complexity of a plant integrated with the several process unit increase, solving a large equation set becomes a challenge. In this situation, we usually use the process flowsheets simulator.

Type of Aspen simulator package 
The sophisticated Aspen Software tool can simulate large process with a high degree of accuracy. It has a model library that includes mixers, splitters, as phase separator, heat exchanger, distillation columns, and reactor pressure changers manipulators, etc. By interconnecting several unit operations, we are able to develop a process flow diagram (PFD) for a complete plant. To solve the model structure of either a single unit of a chemical plant, required Fortran code are built-in in the Aspen simulator.

Aspen simulator has been developed for the simulation of wide variety of processes such as chemical and petrochemical, petroleum refining, polymer, and coal based processes.

Nowadays, different Aspen package are available for simulations with promising performance. Briefly, some of them are presented below.

Aspen Plus – This type of process simulator is used for steady state simulation of chemicals, petrochemicals and petroleum industries. It is also used for performance monitoring, design, optimization and business planning.

Aspen Dynamics –This type of process simulator is used for dynamics study and closed loop control of several process industries. Aspen Dynamics is integrated with Aspen plus.

Aspen Batch CAD – this simulator is typically used for batch processing, reaction and distillations. It allow us to derive reaction and kinetic information form the experimental data to create a process simulation.

Aspen Chromatography-This is a dynamic simulation software package used for both batch chromatography and chromatography simulated moving bed processes.

Aspen Properties- It is useful for the thermophysical properties calculation.

Aspen Polymer Plus – It is a modeling tool for steady state and dynamic simulation and optimization of polymer processes. This is available within Aspen Plus or Aspen Properties rather than via an external menu.

Aspen HYSIS – this process modeling package is typically used for steady state simulation, performance monitoring, design, optimization and business planning for petroleum refining, and oil and gas industries.

Aspen simulate the performance of the designed process. A solid understanding of the underlying chemical engineering principles is needed to supply reasonable value of input parameters and analyse the result obtained. In addition to the process flow diagram, required input information to simulate a process are: setup, components properties, streams and blocks.

Simulation result of batch distillation unit 
The BatchFrac is rigorous model used for simulation of batch distillation column present in the model library of the software. It also includes the reactions occurred in any stage of 
the separator. BatchFrac model does not consider column hydraulics, and there is negligible vapour holdup and constant liquid holdup. Modeling and simulation of batch distillation unit is done with the help of one of the most important process simulators (aspen plus) used in chemical industry with the following data given in the table and check the simulation result.

Various steps are involved in the simulation of batch distillation column using aspen plus software is :
 Understand the problem statement and input stream data

 Specifying the components-  add Ethanol and water from the components list 
 Specifying the property method-UNIFAC
 Go to the simulation library
 Creating flowsheet with help of model library present in the software, for batch distillation choose batchfrac model form library( figure 2)
 Specifying input stream information that is temperature, pressure, Composition type and flow rate of the components
Temperature = 373 K, Pressure=1 bar

Flow basis = Volume( 50 L/hr)

Composition type = mole fraction

Ethanol - 0.5, Water – 0.5
 Specifying block information what type of distillation column is present (Pot +overhead condenser type)
 Configuring settings –types of global unit used – METCBR
 Running the simulation 
 Viewing the result-  check streams result or steam table obtain from the running the simulation (figure 3)  Similarly we can do simulation for other distillation column like fractional distillation by using Redfrac model from model library present in the software.

See also 
 Flash distillation
 Fractional distillation
 Steam distillation
 Process optimization
 Process design
 Software Process simulation
 Modeling and simulation
 Computer simulation
 Advanced Simulation Library
 List of chemical process simulators

References 

Distillation
Simulation